Local elections were held in the United Kingdom in 1989. The Labour Party had the highest projected national vote share, but the Conservative Party, in power at Westminster, gained the most seats.

The national projected share of the vote was Labour 42%, Conservative 36%, Liberal Democrats 19%. The Conservatives gained 92 seats, Labour gained 35 seats and the Liberal Democrats lost 175 seats. It was Labour's largest share of the vote in any election in a decade, as the party's popularity continued to improve as a result of the ongoing modernisation process under Neil Kinnock, and that the Conservative government's popularity was starting to fall following the announcement of the poll tax.

Summary of results

England

Non-metropolitan county councils

Sui generis

Northern Ireland

Wales

County councils

References

Local elections 2006. House of Commons Library Research Paper 06/26.
Vote 2001 BBC News